The NAIA Competitive Dance Championship is an annual competition hosted by the National Association of Intercollegiate Athletics to determine the national champion of collegiate team competitive dance among its members in the United States.

The inaugural event was held in 2017. Each year, it is held concurrently and at the same venue as the NAIA Competitive Cheer Championship. 

The reigning national champions are Morningside, who won their first national title in 2022.

Results

Champions

See also
 NAIA Competitive Cheer Championship

References

External links
NAIA Competitive Dance

Competitive dance